2-hydroxy-4-carboxymuconate semialdehyde hemiacetal dehydrogenase (2-hydroxy-4-carboxymuconate 6-semialdehyde dehydrogenase, 4-carboxy-2-hydroxy-cis,cis-muconate-6-semialdehyde:NADP+ oxidoreductase, alpha-hydroxy-gamma-carboxymuconic epsilon-semialdehyde dehydrogenase, 4-carboxy-2-hydroxymuconate-6-semialdehyde dehydrogenase, LigC, ProD) is an enzyme with systematic name 4-carboxy-2-hydroxymuconate semialdehyde hemiacetal:NADP+ 2-oxidoreductase. This enzyme catalyses the following chemical reaction

 4-carboxy-2-hydroxymuconate semialdehyde hemiacetal + NADP+  2-oxo-2H-pyran-4,6-dicarboxylate + NADPH + H+

Unsubstituted aliphatic or aromatic aldehydes or glucose cannot serve as substrate of this enzyme.

References

External links 
 

EC 1.1.1